The 304th Special Operations Squadron is an inactive United States Air Force unit designation.   It was designated on 15 September 1985 by the consolidation of the World War II 304th Transport Squadron, which was disbanded on 1 December 1943 at Mohanbari Airport, India, and the 4th Strategic Support Squadron, which was discontinued and inactivated on 15 March 1961 at Dyess Air Force Base, Texas.

The 304th was a transport squadron which served primarily in the China-Burma-India Theater.  It participated in the airlift of supplies and equipment from India to China over the Himalayan Mountains ("The Hump").

The 4th was a Strategic Air Command transport squadron providing a limited air transport capability to supplement that of the Military Air Transport Service (MATS).

History

World War II
The squadron was activated by Tenth Air Force in India and equipped with C-47 Skytrains.  It was assigned to the 30th Transport Group in the Assam Valley of eastern India, to aid in moving supplies to China by Air Transport Command (ATC).    The squadron supplemented the ATC aircraft flying over "The Hump" into airfields in China. As more and more ATC aircraft arrived for the logistics mission to China, the 30th Transport Group was inactivated, and the assets of the unit were re-designated Station No. 9, India-China Wing, ATC.

Strategic Air Command
In its early years, along with its own fighter wings for escorting its bombers, SAC formed a limited air transport capability to supplement that of the Military Air Transport Service, which provided SAC with the majority of its airlift support.  The 4th Strategic Support Squadron was activated on 18 February 1953 at Rapid city Air Force Base, South Dakota.

During the postwar years and through the 1950s the squadron carried much classified equipment and personnel to various locations around the world.  It was moved to Dyess AFB, Texas on 15 June 1957, and was inactivated on 15 March 1961  when SAC got out of the transport bushiness.

Consolidated unit
The two units were consolidated on 19 September 1985,  being designated as the 304th Special Operations Squadron, and assigned to USAF Special Operations Command.   There is no record of the unit ever being activated in the Regular Air Force or Reserves.

Lineage
 Constituted as 304th Transport Squadron on 4 June 1943
 Activated in India on 21 June 1943
 Disbanded on 1 December 1943

 Reconstituted, and consolidated (19 September 1985), with 4th Strategic Support Squadron
 Constituted on 3 February 1953
 Activated on 18 February 1953
 Discontinued, and inactivated, on 15 March 1961

 Consolidated squadron re-designated as 304th Special Operations Squadron on 19 September 1985 (Remained Inactive)
 Re-designated as 304th Expeditionary Special Operations Squadron, and converted to provisional status, on 24 January 2005
 Withdrawn from provisional status, and re-designated as 304th Special Operations Squadron, on 30 March 2011

Assignments
 304th Transport Squadron
 30th Transport Group, 21 June-1 December 1943

 4th Strategic Support Squadron
 Eighth Air Force, 18 February 1953
 Fifteenth Air Force, 1 April 1955
 96th Bombardment Wing, 1 September 1959-15 Mar 1961

 304th Special Operations Squadron
 Air Force Special Operations Command to activate or inactivate at any time after 24 January 2005.
 Withdrawn from Air Force Special Operations Command on 30 March 2011

Stations
 304th Transport Squadron
 Mohanbari Airport, India, 21 June-1 December 1943

 4th Strategic Support Squadron
 Rapid City (later, Ellsworth) AFB, South Dakota, 18 February 1953
 Dyess AFB, Texas, 15 June 1957 – 15 March 1961

Aircraft
 C-47 Skytrain, 1943
 C-124 Globemaster II, 1953-1961

See also

 1st Strategic Support Squadron
 2d Strategic Support Squadron
 3d Strategic Support Squadron

References

External links

Military units and formations established in 1943
Troop carrier squadrons of the United States Army Air Forces